The Fingerprint Verification Competition (FVC) is an international competition for fingerprint verification algorithms organized in 2000 by the Biometric System Laboratory (University of Bologna),  the U.S. National Biometric Test Center (San Jose State University) and the Pattern Recognition and Image Processing Laboratory (Michigan State University). After the success of the first edition (FVC2000), three other editions were organized every two years (FVC2002, FVC2004 and FVC2006). 

These events received great attention both from academic and industrial biometric communities. They established a common benchmark, allowing developers to unambiguously compare their algorithms, and provided an overview of the state-of-the-art in fingerprint recognition. 

After the fourth edition, the interest shown in previous editions by the biometrics community has prompted the Biometric System Laboratory (University of Bologna) to organize a new online evaluation campaign not only limited to fingerprint verification algorithms: FVC-onGoing. FVC-onGoing offers web-based automatic evaluation of biometric algorithms on a set of sequestered datasets, reporting results using well known performance indicators and metrics. While previous FVC initiatives were organized as “competitions”, with specific calls and fixed time frames, FVC-onGoing is: 

 an “on going competition” always open to new participants;
 an evolving online repository of evaluation metrics and results.

References

 D. Maio, D. Maltoni, R. Cappelli, J.L. Wayman and A.K. Jain, "FVC2000: Fingerprint Verification Competition", IEEE Transactions on Pattern Analysis Machine Intelligence, vol.24, no.3, pp.402-412, March 2002.
 D. Maio, D. Maltoni, R. Cappelli, J.L. Wayman and A.K. Jain, "FVC2002: Second Fingerprint Verification Competition", in proceedings 16th International Conference on Pattern Recognition (ICPR2002), Québec City, vol.3, pp.811-814, August 2002.
 D. Maio, D. Maltoni, R. Cappelli, J.L. Wayman and A.K. Jain, "FVC2004: Third Fingerprint Verification Competition", in proceedings International Conference on Biometric Authentication (ICBA04), Hong Kong, pp.1-7, July 2004.
 R. Cappelli, D. Maio and D. Maltoni, "Technology Evaluations of Fingerprint-Based Biometric Systems", in proceedings 12th European Signal Processing Conference (EUSIPCO2004), Vienna, Austria, pp.1405-1408, September 2004.
 D. Maio, D. Maltoni, R. Cappelli, J.L. Wayman and A.K. Jain, "Technology Evaluation of Fingerprint Verification Algorithms", in J.L. Wayman, A.K. Jain, D. Maltoni, D. Maio, Biometric Systems - Technology, Design and Performance Evaluation, Springer, 2005.
 R. Cappelli, D. Maio, D. Maltoni, J.L. Wayman and A.K. Jain, "Performance Evaluation of Fingerprint Verification Systems", IEEE Transactions on Pattern Analysis Machine Intelligence, vol.28, no.1, pp.3-18, January 2006.
 R. Cappelli, M. Ferrara, A. Franco and D. Maltoni, "Fingerprint verification competition 2006", Biometric Technology Today, vol.15, no.7-8, pp.7-9, August 2007.
 B. Dorizzi, R. Cappelli, M. Ferrara, D. Maio, D. Maltoni, N. Houmani, S. Garcia-Salicetti and A. Mayoue, "Fingerprint and On-Line Signature Verification Competitions at ICB 2009", in proceedings International Conference on Biometrics (ICB), Alghero, Italy, pp.725-732, June 2009.

External links
FVC 2000
FVC 2002
FVC 2004
FVC 2006
FVC ongoing

Biometrics
Fingerprints